Michael Whitley (born 17 November 1951) is a British politician who has served as the Member of Parliament (MP) for Birkenhead since 2019. He is a member of the Labour Party.

Early life and career 
Whitley was born in St Catherine's Hospital, Birkenhead and grew up in Woodchurch. His father and some of his brothers were in the ship building industry. After time in the Merchant Navy, Whitley worked for Vauxhall Motors becoming a trade union organiser and later regional secretary for Unite.

Parliamentary career 
Whitley was elected as the Labour MP for Birkenhead in the 2019 general election, defeating Frank Field, a former Labour politician. Field resigned the Labour whip after 40 years as Birkenhead's MP and ran as an independent candidate under the banner of the Birkenhead Social Justice Party. Whitley won the seat with a vote share of 59%, down 17.8% on the result that Field achieved in 2017. Aged 68, he was the oldest MP to be elected for the first time in 2019. Whitley's candidacy was endorsed by Momentum and several trade unions. During the 2021 Israel-Palestine Crisis, Whitley signed a letter along with 19 other MPs calling for sanctions on Israel "for its repeated violations of international law."

On 14 December 2021, Whitley resigned from his role as Parliamentary Private Secretary to Ed Miliband in order to defy the whip by voting against mandatory COVID-19 vaccination for NHS staff. He also voted in line with the party whip by voting in favour of COVID-19 vaccine passports and an expansion of mask mandates.

On 24 February 2022, following the 2022 Russian invasion of Ukraine, Whitley was one of 11 Labour MPs threatened with losing the party whip after they signed a statement by the Stop the War Coalition which questioned the legitimacy of NATO and accused the military alliance of "eastward expansion". All 11 MPs subsequently removed their signatures.

References

External links

1951 births
Living people
English trade unionists
Labour Party (UK) MPs for English constituencies
People from Birkenhead
UK MPs 2019–present